Wiseguy is an American crime drama television series that aired on CBS from September 16, 1987, to December 8, 1990, for a total of 75 episodes over four seasons. The series was produced by Stephen J. Cannell and was filmed in Vancouver, British Columbia, to avoid the higher studio costs associated with filming in Los Angeles.

Wiseguy originally starred Ken Wahl as Vinnie Terranova, a Brooklyn native and Fordham University graduate who was a deep cover operative for the FBI under the supervision of senior agent Frank McPike, played by Jonathan Banks. The primary cast was rounded out by Jim Byrnes, who played an information operative known as Lifeguard (real name Daniel Burroughs) who assisted Vinnie in the field.

After the third season, Wahl departed from the series. Steven Bauer was brought in to replace Wahl as the lead, with Cecil Hoffman joining as a fourth regular cast member alongside Bauer and the returning Banks and Byrnes. Wiseguy ended its run midway through the 1990–1991 television season with three produced episodes left unaired.

Synopsis
The series followed Vincent "Vinnie" Terranova, an undercover agent of the OCB (Organized Crime Bureau), a fictional division of the FBI. The show kept its focus on both the mechanics of being deep undercover and the consequences of the protagonist's actions.

Unlike similar series of the day, Wiseguy was serialized over multiple episodes telling a self-contained story that would conclude in the final episode of the cycle. This gave rise to the industry term "story arc". Some cycles were short while others were extended, but each new story had a specific set of central characters exclusive to it who would appear over the course of multiple episodes. For example, Kevin Spacey appeared in seven episodes of a first-season arc as an antagonist, while Jerry Lewis was a protagonist for five episodes in a season-two arc.

Main characters

Vincent Terranova
Vincent Michael "Vinnie" Terranova (Ken Wahl) is an undercover agent who is 30 years old when the series begins. His job is to infiltrate criminal organizations, gather evidence, and then destroy the organization to bring the guilty parties to justice.  At the beginning of the series, he is estranged from his family because of an eighteen-month prison sentence (meant to establish his "wiseguy" credentials with the criminal underworld) and continued ties to criminals, and OCB regulations forbade Vinnie from telling his family the truth. However, his brother Peter (Gerald Anthony), a Catholic priest, knew the truth (Vinnie had revealed everything under the seal of the confessional), and in the first season episode "Prodigal Son" when his Italian-born mother Carlotta (Elsa Raven) is hospitalized after being mugged, Vinnie reveals the truth to her (with McPike and Lifeguard concealing Vinnie's confession from the OCB Regional Director), thereby reconciling mother and son. Carlotta calls him "Vincenzo" but his legal name is Vincent. Vinnie was often seen wearing Fordham University sweatshirts and hats as he and  Peter are Fordham graduates.

Frank McPike
Frank McPike (Jonathan Banks) is Vinnie's superior officer, who assigns Vinnie to cases, supplies him with important information and coordinates backup support. He became OCB Regional Director (RD) and Vinnie's immediate superior after Vinnie was released after completing an eighteen-month sentence in the Newark State Penitentiary (Frank was responsible for ensuring that Vinnie served the full term in order to cement his cover). Since McPike is a known law enforcement official and Vinnie is deep undercover, McPike will often have Vinnie arrested on a trumped-up charge so that he can talk to Vinnie without revealing his identity. Frank has a troubled marriage.  He separates from his wife after diverting some money recovered from a gangster to pay for a liver transplant for her.

Daniel Benjamin "Lifeguard" Burroughs
Lifeguard (Jim Byrnes), with whom Vinnie communicates almost exclusively by telephone, is Vinnie's other contact person. Vinnie (ideally) calls him every morning with the latest updates on the case, and Lifeguard provides him with quick updates. He also, under the name of "Mike Terranova", provides Vinnie with an emergency contact number (555-4958, a play on Vince's agent number), without revealing Vinnie's true identity. (The cover location is "Sailor Hardware"; the code phrase "Uncle Mike" indicates an emergency request for assistance.)  Daniel is a double-leg amputee, but is remarkably mobile in his wheelchair; he is also mobile with a pair of prosthetic legs. Like McPike, Daniel is divorced as a result of his work; his ex-wife stays in close contact, apparently because Daniel has resources she wants, and Daniel endures this with resentment.  Eventually he forms a relationship with OCB's West Coast Lifeguard operator when Vinnie's investigations take him to Washington State.

Michael Santana
Appears in season 4 only as the focal character in Terranova's absence, Santana (Steven Bauer) is a recently disbarred United States Attorney who becomes allies with McPike and the OCB.

Hillary Stein
Appears in season 4 only Stein (Cecil Hoffman) as Santana's fellow U.S. Attorney and love interest.

Episodes

Season 1 (1987–88)

Season 2 (1988–89)

Season 3 (1989–90)

Season 4 (1990)
The fourth season was only done as part of a realignment of CBS' primetime programming lineup that saw switches of other programming, along with some cancellations. It was cancelled later that year.

Synopsis

Season One

Sonny Steelgrave storyline 

FBI undercover agent Vinnie Terranova is released from prison after serving an 18-month sentence to establish his cover. After his training agent is murdered by Dave Steelgrave (Gianni Russo), an Atlantic City Mafia boss, Vinnie vows to infiltrate the organization and take the Steelgraves down. He eventually earns the trust of Sonny Steelgrave (Ray Sharkey), Dave's brother, and after Dave's death and the apparent defection of one of the Steelgrave captains, he is made Sonny's second-in-command. Over time, Vinnie feels conflicted by his genuine feelings of friendship towards Sonny, and having to lie to his mother about his work for the government in order to maintain his cover. Eventually, Sonny discovers that Vinnie is an undercover agent and, about to be arrested for his crimes, commits suicide rather than face the death penalty. Vinnie is ultimately able to overcome the guilt he feels over his betrayal of Sonny and continues to work as an undercover agent.

Mel Profitt story line 
Vinnie, using his reputation developed as a result of infiltrating the Steelgrave crime family, made contact with a hitman/assassin named Roger Lococco (William Russ). However, Vinnie soon discovered a much bigger target: Roger's boss, the (mentally unstable) multi-billionaire international criminal mastermind and arms dealer Mel Profitt (Kevin Spacey), and his sister Susan (Joan Severance). Mel had an addiction to prescription medication (often administered to him by Susan) which further contributed to his unstable emotional state. He was also a believer in Malthusian economics. After much international intrigue involving Mel, Susan and Lococco (who turned out to be a CIA agent, under even deeper cover than Vinnie), the entire organization was destroyed. The arc alluded to an incestuous relationship between Mel and Susan.

After everything collapsed around him, Mel suffered a complete mental breakdown and asked Susan to "send him home". She obliged him by injecting him with a lethal dose of heroin and amphetamines and giving him a Viking funeral, and eventually went insane (through no help of Lococco, who began gaslighting her) and was committed to a mental facility.

As it turned out, the Profitt connection was part of a much larger plot by the CIA to train mercenaries and install a puppet regime in the Caribbean. Lococco's training officer and immediate superior Herb Ketcher proved to be behind the plot and after Vinnie and McPike infiltrated the operation, the entire thing was exposed as a front for an American corporation and Lococco turned state's evidence. Shortly after his testimony, Lococco went off the grid. Ketcher, after being exposed, would take his own life before consequences were dealt to him.

As the arc came to an end Vinnie announced his resignation from OCB and would not listen when McPike said he would give him six months off instead.

Stephen J. Cannell, producer of Wiseguy, stated that the character Jim Profit from the short-lived Fox series Profit (which Cannell also produced) was named after and partially based on the Mel Profitt character.

Note: In 1997 TV Guide ranked the episode "Blood Dance" number 14 on its "100 Greatest Episodes of All Time" list.

Season Two

White supremacy storyline 

At the beginning of the second season, Vinnie is living at home with his mother and brother, Father Pete (Gerald Anthony) and working for a friend at a gas station as everyone in his neighborhood still believes he is in the Mafia.

McPike, meanwhile, has been dispatched to find Vinnie by the new director of OCB, Paul Beckstead. Vinnie's resignation letter has yet to be processed, and McPike has been given the following choice: either debrief Vinnie and process his resignation or bring him back from sabbatical. Vinnie refuses to go along.

Meanwhile, his friend gets an eviction notice and nearly is driven to sabotage in an attempt to protect his business. A patron of his turns him on to the teachings of "Dr." Knox Pooley (Fred Dalton Thompson), who leads a group called the "Pilgrims of Promise" that has white supremacist leanings. His right-hand man, Calvin Hollis, has a particularly dim view of Jewish people and he leads a group of Pilgrims in an attack on a synagogue. In the aftermath of the attack, Pete goes on television condemning the attack; shortly after he is run down in an alley.

After agreeing to return to work, but only on his terms, Vinnie discovers that Hollis runs an even more extreme group than he knew about and one that is determined to eradicate other races by any means. Pooley is simply a con man and former used car salesman trying to make money off of the men who follow him. Hollis' grip on reality loosens more significantly as the time goes on, eventually leading to him murdering a talk show host which finally sets Pooley off and causes him to disavow his existence. Before Hollis can be brought to justice for his crimes, he is killed in a fire which he inadvertently set by shooting a crony of his. Pooley, meanwhile, simply moves on to his next angle: selling beachfront real estate in Florida.

Garment trade storyline 

David Sternberg (Ron Silver) and his father Eli (Jerry Lewis) ran a clothing business, and were being squeezed by the fearsome gangster Rick Pinzolo (Stanley Tucci). David goes to the OCB for help, thus Vinnie is recruited to act as security for the Sternbergs. A small-time loanshark attacked and injured Vinnie in 7th Avenue Freeze Out. Then in the following  episode, Next of Kin, he was hit by a taxi cab and he was temporarily replaced by retired agent John Henry Raglin (Anthony Denison). (This was done in order to allow Ken Wahl to recover from a broken ankle he suffered in an on-set accident.) Raglin brought down (and killed) Pinzolo, but not in time to save Eli's business or David's life. Joan Chen appeared in one episode of this arc, as a rebellious Chinese sweatshop worker with whom the married Raglin briefly has an affair. After Raglin breaks Pinzolo's jaw, the character has his jaw wired shut, requiring Tucci to talk through clenched teeth afterward.

Dead Dog Records storyline 

Upon his recovery, Vinnie's next assignment took him into the music business, where he dealt with music impresario Isaac Twine (Paul Winfield) and his wife Amber (Patti D'Arbanville). He was set up as a new executive in a front company, "Dead Dog Records", which was originally created by the Drug Enforcement Administration, who offered it to the OCB when their investigation ended.  Vinnie then attempted to infiltrate the music industry in search of corruption.  The principal villain of this arc is English-American record mogul Winston Newquay (pronounced Noo-kway in the show, rather than Nyoo-key in the English fashion).  Newquay, played by Tim Curry, ruthlessly cheats the artists under his control, funneling their money into his own companies while hiding his activities with accounting tricks.

Debbie Harry, Mick Fleetwood, Deidre Hall and Glenn Frey also appear during this story arc.

Season Three

Mafia Wars storyline 

At the beginning of the third season, Vinnie had not been assigned any recent cases, but, in usual Wiseguy fashion, a case found him. Vinnie's stepfather, Don Rudy Aiuppo (George O. Petrie) was shot and wounded, leaving Vinnie the temporary head of the local Mafia commission (to Frank McPike's delight).  Vinnie investigated the other members, including Albert Cericco (Robert Davi). Eventually, Vinnie brought down most of the commission, only to find Aiuppo had been manipulating him to exact revenge on some rivals. An enraged Vinnie angrily told Aiuppo that, stepfather or not, he wanted nothing more to do with him. Aiuppo in turn tried to drive a wedge between Vinnie and his mother by implying that he had learned of Vinnie's undercover role from her.  In reality, he had bugged a payphone outside his hospital room, thinking that the various Mafiosi visiting him would be using it just after taking their leave; Vinnie had used it to contact Uncle Mike.

Washington, D.C., storyline ("The Capitol Conspiracy")

Vinnie was summoned to the Justice Department and put in charge of an investigation of Japanese yen counterfeiting, unaware that the whole thing was a setup by certain unscrupulous government figures who sought payback for damaging fallout from the Mel Profitt case. Based on the real-life Operation Bernhard, the conspirators aim to undermine the Japanese economy by printing large amounts of counterfeit Yen, smuggling them into Japan on cargo aircraft, and then announcing it; all in order to devalue the currency. After the revelation, a convenient scapegoat is supposed to take the blame, in this case, Vinnie. When the plan is foiled en route, Vinnie nevertheless becomes the focus of an investigation, and is only saved when a third party "connects the dots" for the investigating committee.

Lynchboro/Seattle storyline 

Vinnie was made a deputy of a small town called Lynchboro in Washington state, where local strongman Mark Volchek (Steve Ryan) was essentially treating the town like his own personal dictatorship. Vinnie worked under Sheriff Matthew Stemkowsky, nicknamed "Stem".

The arc took an unexpected turn when recent murders, including several of Stemkowsky's deputies, were determined to be the work of a serial killer based on the then real life unsolved Green River Killer cases. As a large federal task force was on its way to Lynchboro, Volchek, fearful of the disruption and attention, was determined to identify the killer through his knowledge of the town and residents. Vinnie, however, was convinced it was Volchek.  Volchek displayed a curious obsession with the movie "Mr. Sardonicus", which became a factor later in the arc.

The night before the task force was to descend on Lynchboro, Volchek worked with McPike to try to narrow down the possible suspects through a rapid series of deductions. Eventually, a frustrated Stem cracks under the intensifying pressure and confesses his crimes.

However, rather than face justice,
Stem chose to violently kill himself with a stun gun in front of his deputies. Vinnie immediately began having flashbacks of Sonny Steelgrave's death and went off the grid, making one phone call to someone who owed him a favor. (This story-arc was, in mood and setting, eerily prescient of the early episodes of the show Twin Peaks,  which debuted a few weeks after the sequence was aired.)

That person turned out to be Roger Lococco, who himself had gone off the grid two years earlier once he testified in the Mel Profitt investigation. He replaced Stem as sheriff and immediately began looking deeper into Volchek, who had a dream to build a hospital focusing on cryogenics. After fate turned against him, however, Volchek eventually was talked into loosening his grip on the town. In a cameo appearance, film critic Jeffrey Lyons appeared as himself to deconstruct the movie that Volchek was obsessed with.  Re-enacting part of the movie with Volchek as the main character became part of his recovery.

Vinnie, meanwhile, wound up in Seattle with $42 to his name, which he used to rent a room in a transient hotel. He took a job with a waste removal company called Health Elimination Services that specialized in dumping medical waste. Vinnie, working for $100 a day, discovered that one of his jobs, dumping bodily fluids into a storm drain near an elementary school, resulted in a hepatitis outbreak at the school and that the company was aware of it.

Embroiled in the company manager's desperate attempts at covering up, Vinnie fled in repulsion from hired assassins as well as from his own burgeoning violent impulse, which resulted in him violently beating the manager and disposing of two of the assassins. He would find respite in a city church. Just as McPike found him in hiding there, a would-be assassin's bullet missed Vinnie and critically wounded McPike, propelling Vinnie on a final pursuit of justice.

Season Four 
After the third season ended, Ken Wahl left Wiseguy over a dispute with CBS over the direction of the show. Steven Bauer was brought in to be the new lead character, a former United States Attorney named Michael Santana who had recently been disbarred. Jonathan Banks and Jim Byrnes returned in their regular roles, and new addition Cecil Hoffman rounded out the cast. A new theme song by Mike Post, who wrote the original theme, was commissioned and had a more Latin flair. The series also found a new timeslot, moving to Saturday nights at 10:00 pm Eastern.

Guzman storyline

The season began with a raid on a drug warehouse in Miami run by the Medellín Cartel, with United States Attorney Michael Santana leading the raid. The head of the cartel is put on trial and is headed for a near certain conviction. However, as the jury deliberates, a Miami policeman comes forward and reveals he coerced a confession which led to the warrant being issued. Santana's misconduct after finding all of this out results in the dismissal of the case and eventually his disbarment.

Meanwhile, back in Washington, a now-bearded McPike has fully healed from the gunshot wounds he sustained at the end of the previous year and Director Beckstead is looking to have him assume desk duty. McPike, after all he has been through over the recent months, does not agree and leaves frustrated. Soon, however, that becomes the least of his problems.

A significant communication breakdown occurs between Vinnie and Lifeguard while all of this is going down. Vinnie regularly checks in with Lifeguard to receive his daily briefing. These check-ins recently and quite abruptly stopped, Lifeguard relays this much to McPike, and he does not go into any further detail than that. McPike leaves Washington bound for Brooklyn, which was Vinnie’s last known location, trying to figure out what has happened and convinced he is being kept in the dark on something.

When McPike enters the apartment, he discovers that Vinnie’s disappearance may have been even more sudden than even he realized. The shower in Vinnie’s bathroom is running, while a pot of pasta sits boiling on his stove and the TV in his living room is on. Further inspection reveals a handprint on the door, which leads McPike to believe that Vinnie may have been abducted by someone and relays his findings to Lifeguard, who agrees that Vinnie could not have left the apartment on his own accord.

Trying to find answers, McPike drops in on Carlotta Terranova and Don Aiuppo to find out more. One of their neighbors, a Catholic priest, had been murdered by a right-wing death squad in El Salvador, and Vinnie had been assisting the family in trying to find answers. Since Vinnie had made contact with Michael Santana before disappearing, McPike traveled to Miami to meet with him. The two confirmed that Vinnie had been kidnapped.

Soon, McPike and Santana found Amado Guzman (Maximilian Schell), a Cuban-American businessman who worked for the cartel as a money launderer. They also found out that Guzman was offering support to the Salvadoran death squad, which in addition to murdering the priest was responsible for Vinnie's kidnapping. With the help of U.S. Attorney Hillary Stein (Hoffmann), who had been working the original case as Santana's AUSA before his removal and disbarment and was his love interest, they took Guzman's operation down.

Despite this, OCB never was able to locate Vinnie. He was presumed dead, being killed by the same death squad he had been investigating, and a memorial service was held in his honor. McPike spoke at the service, where he revealed the truth regarding Vinnie's services with the FBI and OCB.

OCB disbands

With the Guzman investigation closed, McPike convinced Santana to become an official OCB agent. However, Director Beckstead is forced to shut down the task force due to budget cuts. Instead, McPike and Santana are sent to the New York FBI office to work in tandem with the U.S. Attorney's office there. They were immediately thrust into an investigation into a scheme involving the deaths of several naval pilots in crashes involving faulty plane parts. Former AUSA Stein, meanwhile, has joined her family's law firm and taken on the case, but after the firm's partners elect to not go after the partmaker she turns her attention to finding justice for the families affected by the crashes. Through the work of McPike and Santana, as well as the continued covert work from Lifeguard, the head of the company is arrested and brought to justice.

Cancellation
Wiseguy was cancelled after one additional episode (with Billy Dee Williams as a guest) aired.

The program was never the strongest ratings draw, despite the positive feedback from critics. The loss of Ken Wahl combined with the move to a traditionally low rated Saturday night spot depleted the ratings further and the series came to its end after 75 episodes.

Ken Wahl said that the entire fourth season concept was "ridiculous" because it got away from what Wiseguy had been about: Whereas before the show was more character driven, CBS wanted to make the show more of an action-based crime drama and Wahl felt he could not continue in the role if that was where they wanted to go.

Non-arc episodes 

There were also several stand-alone episodes between the arcs, most of which dealt with the personal lives of the main characters.  For instance:

"Aria for Don Aiuppo"
Mama Carlotta Terranova falls for and marries an old flame, Rudy Aiuppo, whom she had formerly gave up, when he chose a life of crime. Aiuppo switches places with his recently reconciled (and dead-ringer) brother, who has returned to Italy, while Aiuppo fades back into the old neighborhood.

"Stairway to Heaven"
Frank discovers his wife is dying of liver failure, but cannot get a transplant due to her alcoholism. He uses money provided by Vinnie ("Date with an Angel") to obtain an under-the-table liver transplant, saving her life. However, feeling that Frank was the cause of her drinking, she asks for a separation, and Frank temporarily moves in with Vinnie.

"White Noise"
Vinnie enters a mental hospital for general treatment and is set up by Daryl Elias, who can work computers and has a score to settle.  Sonny Steelgrave is brought back via Vinnie's memory and Vinnie resolves his guilt issues.

"Call It Casaba"
Vinnie, Frank and Lifeguard go on a camping weekend, but Lifeguard has his daughter's marriage on his mind. This isn't helped when the daughter shows up at his cabin. This episode is a fan favorite, and was especially a favorite of co-star Jonathan Banks.

"Sleepwalk"
After the "Dead Dog Records" arc, Vinnie has a liaison with Amber Twine, who was widowed when her husband suffered a heart attack during the main story.  He attempts to live in her world of late nights with musicians but finds he has no interest in it, and she has no interest in his world.  This sequence featured a cameo by blues harp player Kim Wilson and his band, The Fabulous Thunderbirds.

"How Will They Remember Me?"
Vinnie discovers his late father's old diary and sees his very honest father faced the same temptations from criminals that Vinnie faces today. This is the only episode of the series not to feature Jonathan Banks as Frank McPike, due to the episode mostly taking place in flashbacks.

"People Do It All the Time"
Lifeguard's family troubles continue as he comes to grips with becoming a grandfather. He steps in when his son-in-law gets involved with an unscrupulous construction company.

"The Reunion"
Vinnie attends his high school reunion, where he is reunited with an old flame who now works for the NYPD. This episode brought back Mike "Mooch" Cacciatore from the Garment Trade arc as Vinnie's high school buddy.

"Meet Mike McPike"
Frank has family problems when his father, Mike McPike, gets thrown out of yet another nursing home.

"To Die in Bettendorf"
Steelgrave's cohort, Sid Royce (Patrice's Harvard-educated accountant), is arrested, but discovers Terranova is a federal agent. Royce is given immunity, turns state's evidence, and he and his wife enter witness relocation, to McPike's protests. However, McPike is allowed to choose Royce's destination and Royce consequently becomes a Foot Locker-type shoe salesman named "Elvis Prim" in Bettendorf, Iowa, far from the bright lights of New York City. Despondent, Royce's wife leaves him for a cowboy, triggering him into a mental breakdown. Royce then goes off the grid and tracks down McPike just as McPike and his separated wife are on the verge of reconciliation. McPike kills Royce in a hostage situation (Terranova offers to do the deed but McPike turns him down).

"Romp"
Vinnie attends the bachelor party of his friend Jimmy, and helps Jimmy get out from under a loan shark's thumb.

TV movie 

In 1996, ABC commissioned a reunion movie with the possibility of a revival series in the works. Ken Wahl, Jonathan Banks, and Jim Byrnes all reprised their roles.

In order to explain the disappearance of Vinnie, a story was devised which effectively 
retconned the series and disregarded the events of season four. Following his desertion after witnessing Stem's suicide during the Volchek case in Washington state, as well as his problems with his stepfather, the FBI pulled Vinnie out of OCB and reassigned him to a wiretapping detail where he was still working at the time the film began.

Vinnie is ordered to infiltrate the organization of criminal boss Paul Callendar (Ted Levine). The movie had many of the same themes as the TV show, including Vinnie's constant conflict in betraying the people he had grown to care about.

Under the title of Wiseguy, the TV movie premiered on May 2, 1996. While the movie was a critical success, ABC aired it against NBC's Thursday night Must See TV lineup and it failed to draw many viewers. In addition, Wahl suffered a broken neck in 1992 in a fall that left him temporarily quadriplegic and by the time the Wiseguy reunion was commissioned, he had been in near constant pain after he regained the use of his arms and legs and would likely not have been physically capable to take on the demands of the role. Thus, the movie was the last time the original Wiseguy cast appeared in their roles. The movie was rerun on Sleuth in 2008.

While never released on VHS or DVD in the United States, the movie was released overseas on Video CD (MagnaVision CW071-003001) but is no longer commercially available.

Home media/streaming/rebroadcast 
In May 2009, Mill Creek Entertainment announced that they had acquired the rights to release Wiseguy on DVD in Region 1. They subsequently released the complete first season on August 25, 2009. On March 9, 2010, Mill Creek released Wiseguy: The Collector's Edition, a 13-disc set featuring 67 episodes from all four seasons.  However, due to rights issues with the music contained in the show, the "Dead Dog Records" arc from Season 2 (eight of 22 episodes) is not included.

Beyond Home Entertainment has released all four seasons on DVD in Region 4, again without the "Dead Dog Records" arc episodes.

On August 12, 2022, Visual Entertainment released Wiseguy - The Complete Collection, a 14-disc set that features, for the first time on DVD, all 75 episodes of the series.

omits the eight-episode "Dead Dog Records" arc

The first season became available on iTunes on April 28, 2008.

As of 2022, the series, except the "Dead Dog Records" arc, is available on Peacock and Tubi. Other streaming options include: Roku, Pluto, FILMRISE, freevee, and Amazon Prime.

As of 2022, the series is being rebroadcast on Circle and Ace TV.  Circle is showing all 75 episodes, including the episodes in the "Dead Dog Records" arc.

Awards

References

External links

1980s American crime drama television series
1990s American crime drama television series
1980s American police procedural television series
1990s American police procedural television series
1987 American television series debuts
1990 American television series endings
CBS original programming
Edgar Award-winning works
Television series by Stephen J. Cannell Productions
Television shows set in Florida
Television series about organized crime
Works about the American Mafia
English-language television shows
Television series created by Stephen J. Cannell
Television series created by Frank Lupo
Television shows filmed in Vancouver